The Hukawng Valley (also spelt Hukaung Valley) is an isolated valley in Myanmar, roughly  in area.  It is located in Tanaing Township in the Myitkyina District of Kachin State in the northernmost part of the country. It has the Hukaung Valley Wildlife Sanctuary.

Rivers

The rivers draining into the Hukawng Valley, the Tanai Kha, the Tabye, the Tawan, and the Turong, form the headwaters of the Chindwin River.

Protected area
Ringed by steep mountain ranges to the north, east and west, the valley is known as a habitat of tigers, but encroachment by man has greatly decreased their numbers, to perhaps as few as 100 animals. The government's establishment of the preserve was accomplished in cooperation with the Kachin Independent Army, a formerly-rebel group that inhabits the region.

The extremely rare leaf muntjac, also known as the phet-gyi, dwarf deer or leaf deer, also lives in the Hukawng.

Industries
Major industry includes amber and gold mining; most gold mines are now depleted, but the toxic chemicals from former gold extraction have not been cleared, and are seeping into the groundwater.

Discoveries

The valley is well known for Burmese amber, a type of amber dating back to the Cretaceous period, around 99 million years ago.

History
During World War II, the Ledo Road was built by the US Army across the Hukawng Valley, largely by African-American engineer battalions and Chinese laborers, in order to supply the armies of the Republic of China, who were then allied with the Western Allies in the war against the Empire of Japan.

See also

Ledo Road (Stillwell Road)
Lake of No Return
Pangsau Pass

References

External links 
 World's Biggest Tiger Reserve

Valleys of Myanmar
World War II sites in Burma
Kachin State